Yeomanry are part of the reserve for the British Army. At the start of First World War there were fifty-four yeomanry regiments in the British Army. Soon after the declaration of war, it was decided to increase the number of these volunteer mounted regiments. The new regiments were mirror formations of the existing first line regiments, with the same name and served initially in the same brigades. However they were all classed as second line units. The first line regiments, were numbered the 1/1st while the second line became the 2/1st (regimental name) or in cases where there were more regiments with the same name, or already numbered, the 2/2nd or 2/3rd.

Territorial Force mounted brigades were known by their district name until August 1915, when they became numbered. For most of their existence the second line regiments and brigades were used as a coastal defence force. Most of the second line regiments were converted to cyclist battalions in 1916, and never served in a recognised theatre of war. Several were disbanded and its men transferred to other regiments and one served as an army corps cavalry regiment on the Western Front.

List

Notes

References

Bibliography
 
 
 

 
 
Army Reserve (United Kingdom)
British Army in World War I
Yeomanry